S-777,469 is a drug developed by Shionogi which is a cannabinoid receptor agonist, with 128x selectivity for the CB2 subtype, having a CB2 affinity of 36nM, and a CB1 affinity over 4600nM. 

In animal studies it showed antipruritic effects, and passed Phase II human trials for the treatment of atopic dermatitis, but development was ultimately not continued further.

See also
 BMS-F
 RQ-00202730
 S-444,823

References

Cannabinoids
Nitrogen heterocycles